Charles Leonard "Lenny" McGill (born May 31, 1971) is a former professional American football cornerback in the National Football League. He currently is a Scout for the Miami Dolphins. He played five seasons for the Green Bay Packers, the Atlanta Falcons, and the Carolina Panthers.

References

1971 births
Living people
Players of American football from Long Beach, California
Arizona State Sun Devils football players
American football cornerbacks
Green Bay Packers players
Atlanta Falcons players
Carolina Panthers players